The Kia Mohave, marketed in North America and China as the Kia Borrego, is a sport utility vehicle (SUV) manufactured by the South Korean manufacturer Kia. The vehicle debuted in 2008 in the Korean and U.S. markets. The Kia Borrego is named after the Anza-Borrego Desert State Park in California; Borrego means "bighorned sheep" which can be found in the state park.


First generation (HM; 2008)

Production history
The production model, designed by automotive designer Peter Schreyer, former chief designer for Audi, was introduced at the 2008 North American International Auto Show.  The vehicle was originally shown as a concept car under the Kia Mesa name at the 2005 North American International Auto Show and went on sale in Korea as the Mohave prior to its release in the United States. In the US, the Borrego went on hiatus for the 2010 model year, with no word on its return or cancellation, after lower than expected sales in 2009. Kia, however, still continued selling the Borrego in Canada, meaning the Borrego was a Canada-only nameplate from 20102011. Domestic versions of the Mohave do not wear any Kia badges, instead using a version of the Kia Opirus's logo, due to their status as Kia's flagship models.

As of October 28, 2011, the model was discontinued with the Sorento as a successor, except the Middle East, China, Central Asia, Brazil, Chile and Russia. It was later dropped from the Chinese and Brazilian markets.

Technical details
The Borrego utilized body-on-frame construction, with adjustable air-suspension, hill-descent control and a high- and low-range automatic transmission. The Borrego has three standard rows of seats in the US. The Borrego is fitted with either the 3.0 L VGT diesel V6 (in 2010), second-generation Lambda II 3.8 L V6 producing  or the 4.6 L V8 Hyundai Tau engine. The Tau V8 is tuned to give less power but more torque than in the Hyundai Genesis sedan, and creates . A navigation system was available as an option.
2011 introduced an upgraded engine and powertrain package, featuring an updated S-Line 3.0 L V6 CRDi (now named S-II) paired with an all-new eight-speed automatic transmission from Hyundai Powertech (shared with Hyundai-Kia's full-size rear-drive luxury sedans).

North America

The Kia Borrego was introduced as the largest SUV in Kia's lineup of vehicles in the U.S. in July 2008 for the 2009 model year. The lineup of the Borrego in the U.S. was as follows:

The LX was the base Kia Borrego, though was very well-equipped for its $26,245 MSRP base price. It included such features as: cloth upholstery, keyless entry, AM/FM stereo with single-disc CD/MP3 player and USB/iPod and auxiliary audio input jacks and SIRIUS Satellite Radio, six speakers, air conditioning, alloy wheels, and a 3.8 L V6 engine with automatic transmission. Features such as a 4.6 L V8 engine were optional.

The EX was the uplevel version of the Kia Borrego, had a $27,995 MSRP base price, and added features such as: an AM/FM stereo with six-disc in-dash CD/MP3 changer and USB/iPod and auxiliary audio input jacks and SIRIUS Satellite Radio, an Infinity premium sound system with external amplifier and rear-mounted subwoofer, a power sunroof, and dual-zone climate controls. Features such as heated dual front bucket seats and a 4.6 L V8 engine were optional.

The Limited was the top-of-the-line version of the Kia Borrego, had a $37,995 MSRP base price, and added features such as: a standard 4.6 L V8 engine, leather seating surfaces, power dual front bucket seats, upgraded alloy wheels, heated dual front bucket seats, optional touch-screen GPS navigation with voice recognition, and a Homelink transmitter.

Bluetooth hands-free telephone and wireless stereo audio streaming were optional for all models.

2009 was the only model year for the Borrego in the U.S. After unsuccessful sales in the U.S. for 2009, the Kia Borrego was discontinued, and its replacement, the all-new, second-generation 2011 Kia Sorento, began production in West Point, Georgia in 2010. Although it did not feature a V8 engine (instead offering all-new Inline Four-Cylinder (I4) and V6 engines), it offered all the features the Kia Borrego had, including a new third-row seating option for all models except the Base model.

Due to rising oil prices at the time, the 4.6 L Tau V8 was dropped from the range in other markets.

Facelift (2016)

A facelift to the Mohave was launched in early 2016. Changes include improved safety as well as upgrades to interior and exterior trim packages. New features such as rear-side warning system, lane departure warning system, forward collision warning system, around-view monitoring system, day-time running lights, HID-headlights, LED taillights and foglights. The S-Line V6 received a minor update, incorporating an SCR (Selective Catalytic Reduction System) in order to meet with stringent EURO6 diesel emissions standards.

FCEV Concept
The Kia Borrego FCEV was a concept car produced by Hyundai-Kia and first shown at the 2008 Los Angeles Auto Show. The concept was based on a pre-facelift production Borrego and features a fuel cell putting out , a companion super-capacitor rated at 450 volts (134 horsepower) and a  electric motor driving through the front wheels. A limited rollout had been scheduled between 2010-2012, as part of Kia's testing programme.

Second facelift (HM2; 2019)

Previewed during the 2019 Seoul Motor Show as the Masterpiece Concept, the second facelift Mohave was released in September 2019 for the 2020 model year. Currently available in the Korean market, the second facelift is essentially a major overhaul to bring the Mohave in line with Kia's current product lineup. Retaining the original body-on-frame chassis plus an improved S-II engine and powertrain package from the previous model, the latest iteration benefits from features such as: a fully redesigned interior, heads-up display, full-LED headlights and LED taillights, electric tailgate, premium Lexicon-equipped sound system, and the ability to select up to six driving modes (Snow, Mud, Sand, Sport, Eco and Comfort).

Awards
 Kia Borrego (Kia Mohave) has been selected as the “Best Kept Secret” in the Autobytel.com.
 Kia Borrego Awarded the "Best-in-Class Sport Utility Vehicle $25,000-$35,000" award as part of the New England Motor Press Association (NEMPA) 2009 Winter Vehicle Awards competition.
 Kia Borrego has been named the top-rated ‘SUV $25,000-$35,000’ in the Edmunds.com Consumers’ Top Rated Vehicle awards in the US.  Borrego earned strong marks from consumers for its overall excellent value, along with impressive power and towing capacity, interior space, visibility, fuel economy and extensive list of standard features.

References

External links

 (South Korea) 

Mid-size sport utility vehicles
Mohave
Rear-wheel-drive vehicles
All-wheel-drive vehicles
Cars introduced in 2008
2010s cars
Flagship vehicles
Hydrogen cars
Fuel cell vehicles